VEB Plasticart was a model and toy manufacturer established in 1958 in Zschopau, East Germany.

VEB Plasticart produced around 40 different kits and a few games (e.g. the mancala game "Badari") made of plastic. Most kits were static models and used scale 1/100 for airliners, 1/50 and later 1/72 for smaller aircraft. They also produced a model of the Soviet spaceship Vostok (scaled 1/25) and the Energia rocket with the Soviet space shuttle Buran (1/288). Many of them are today valued collector items.

History 
VEB Plasticart was established in 1958 in Zschopau, East Germany. VEB (Volkseigener Betrieb) was a Communist-era designation, meaning "company owned by the people". The company was called KVZ from 1958-1969, MPKAB from 1969-1973, VEB Plasticart Zschopau from 1973-1989 and Mastermodell GmbH from 1989-1991. After a two-years break the company was sold in 1993 by the German Treuhand (an organization which privatized state owned enterprises of the GDR) to Manfred Wader. It is today called Plasticart. In 1993 the company had only 37 workers left. A new factory was constructed in Elterlein, Saxony, and now the company counts over 70 workers. They no longer make kits, but playthings for toddlers. In late 2012 German company Reifra has resumed production of the some former Plasticalt model kits.

The "VEB" title was applied to a range of small semi-autonomous businesses in the GDR that made goods especially for export. The GDR needed to export as much as possible to earn foreign "hard" currency as its own "soft" Ostmark was not freely convertible and could only be obtained and used within the GDR. Consequently, VEB Plasticart was able to sell cheap, but well designed, plastic construction kits to the Western countries in exchange for much-needed Western currencies.

The factory was located in August-Bebel Strasse 2, 936 Zschopau, German Democratic Republic.

For a long time the name "VEB" has stood with modelers for plastic construction kits from East Germany. The company changed its name several times.
KVZ ("VEB Kunststoff-Verarbeitung Zschopau") This name lasted until 1969 and is translated as  "Plastic Processing Zschopau". The kits had very nice packaging, usually made of thicker cardboard and a great cover image. The company logo was at that time the snake.
MPKAB ("VEB Modell -und Plastspielwaren Kombinat Annaberg-Buchholz") This very long name was used from 1969-1973 and stands for "VEB model and plastic toys combine Annaberg-Buchholz". The kits of this period, were packed in the classic familiar blue standard boxes, but, no company logo.
In this era the combined company released 1:87 scale die-cast car and military vehicle models. "ESPEWE MODELLE" logo was used on the package.
VEB Kombinat Plasticart Annaberg-Buchholz This name was used for die-cast vehicle models. "PLASTICART modelle" logo was used on the package.
VEB Plasticart Zschopau That was the last name as "VEB" from 1973 to 1989, the packaging was the same as from 1969/70 but from 1973 they then received a company logo. From 1987, some kits appeared in a very novel black box, with a picture of a constructed model on the cover.
Mastermodell GmbH From 1989 to 1991 they were produced as a limited company under that name.

In addition to these company names, two more brand names were used by UK importers: "Playfix" from the mid-1980s and "Nu-Bee" from the early 1990s.

Products 
Starting with an Ilyushin Il-14 airliner in HO scale, following it with a 1/40th scale Aero 45 twin engine low wing monoplane, Plasticart soon produced a scale model of the Baade 152, the first jet turbine airliner to be produced by the GDR and the last development in a line of aircraft that sprung from the former Junkers works in Leipzig and Dresden (both then in the GDR). Next up was the stalwart of Interflug's European network, the four-engined Ilyushin IL-18 turboprop.

The first of the famous Soviet airliner series to appear, in 1963, was the Tupolev Tu-104, the first medium haul jet aircraft to go into regular sustained airline service. The early Plasticart Tu-104 set the standard for all the kits that followed. It was scaled at 1:100 which whilst not common for aircraft kits at the time, was close to FROG models' 1:96 scale and matched contemporary East German TT trains such as Berliner Bahn. In addition, the kit set a standard for being simple to assemble, with a minimal number of parts, sturdy landing gear and a full decal sheet. Instructions, often printed in German, Russian, Polish and Czech, were aimed squarely at consumers in the Comecon countries, where Plasticart kits were both affordable and plentiful. They included exploded diagrams, but no English instructions.

Because the drawings were easy to obtain, Plasticart began to introduce a comprehensive range of detailed models of Soviet airliners and other Warsaw Pact aircraft. Whilst the Tu-104 had only been available with Aeroflot markings, the new introductions mostly came with Interflug decals – markings of the state airline of the GDR.

The latest airliners soon made it into the range, including the Tupolev Tu-134, Tu-154, Ilyushin's Il-62 long range airliner, the Antonov design bureau's An-24 twin engine short hauled feeder-liner and the Czech-built Let L-410 Turbolet twin prop commuter aircraft. Later additions included the remarkable Yakovlev Yak-40 tri-jet short-haul "hot & high" jet and the Tu-144 supersonic jet, known by NATO as the Charger or popularly as "Concordski". A mix of Soviet fighter aircraft and especially, helicopters, was also produced including the giant Mil Mi-10 flying crane, the famous MiG-21 "Fishbed" (1/100) and Sukhoi Su-7 "Fitter" fighters (1/72 scale).

But it is the Western airliners that are most sought after by collectors today. The eclectic choice commenced with a very large kit of the Douglas DC-8-54 series. The DC-8 was in early KLM  stripes livery and is today very sought after. It was subsequently re-issued with an updated KLM decal sheet. The box art for the De Havilland DH106 Comet 4 airliner depicted it departing from Hong Kong Kai Tak airport. Full BOAC decals are included. The SE210 Caravelle was also released in this era, in the markings of a French prototype destined for Air France. Then the Boeing 727-100 got the Plasticart treatment with box art in Pan-Am colours. Plasticart then added the Hawker Siddeley Trident initially in British European Airways colours, but later in British Airways livery, and then the unsuccessful Dassault Mercure of which only 11 units were built, all going to French domestic airline Air Inter.

Later models, such as the 1/72 scale Junkers G23/24 tri-motor corrugated aluminium airliner were detailed and well moulded. Western fighter jets also made an appearance with the introduction of the delta-wing Saab Draken in 1/100 to complement the MiG-21. Along with the aircraft and helicopter kits, VEB Plasticart also produced a model of the first manned spaceship Vostok 3KA (1/25) and the Soviet Energia rocket with Buran (1/288). The Vostok kit is almost the same size as Revell's Vostok, and the box artwork is also very similar, but the two are completely different. Revell's Vostok is actually 1/24 scale and it was initially released in the late 1960s.

List of Plastic Models
Civil aircraft (Eastern)
Ilyushin Il-14 "Crate"	(1/87) 1958
Aero 45 (1/50) 1959
Dresden Baade 152 (1/100) 1960
Ilyushin Il-18 "Coot" (1/100) 1961
Antonov An-2  "Colt" (1/75) 1962
Antonov An-12 "Cub" (1/100) 1963
Tupolev Tu-104 "Camel"	(1/100) 1963
Tupolev Tu-114 "Cleat"	(1/100) 1963
Tupolev Tu-134 "Crusty" (1/100) 1963
Aero L-60 Brigadýr (1/100) 1965
Ilyushin Il-62 "Classic" (1/100) 1965
Yakovlev Yak-40 "Codling" (1/100) 1967
Tupolev Tu-144 "Charger" (1/100) 1969
Tupolev Tu-154 "Careless" (1/100) 1973
Let L-410 Turbolet (1/100) 1975
Antonov An-24 "Coke" (1/100) 1975
Antonov An-14 "Clod" (1/72) 1988
Civil aircraft (Western)
Douglas DC-8-54 (1/100) 1963
Sud Aviation SE210 Caravelle (1/100) 1963
de Havilland DH106 Comet-4 (1/100) 1964
Boeing 727-100 (1/100) 1968
Hawker-Siddeley HS121 Trident 2 (1/100) 1973
Dassault Mercure (1/100) 1975
Junkers G23/24 (1/72) 1987
Military aircraft
Mikoyan-Gurevich MiG-15 "Fagot" (1/50)
Ilyushin Il-28 "Beagle" (1/100) 1970
Mikoyan-Gurevich MiG-21 "Fishbed" (1/100) 1973
Saab 35 Draken (1/100) 1973
Sukhoi Su-7 "Fitter" (1/72) 1973
Tupolev Tu-20/95 "Bear" (1/100) 1975
Beriev Be-6 "Madge" (1/72) 1975
Tupolev Tu-2 "Bat" (1/72) 1977
Helicopters
Mil Mi-1 "Hare" (1/100) 1967
Mil Mi-4 "Hound" (1/100) 1967
Mil Mi-6 "Hook" (1/87) 1967
Mil Mi-10K "Harke" (1/100) 1968
Yakovlev Yak-24P "Horse" (1/100) 1968
Spacecraft
Vostok 3KA (1/25)
Energia/Buran (1/288) 1988

References 
 Plasticart - Scale modeling sets from the GDR (in German)
 VEB Plasticart collector and modelling (in Romanian)
 Plasticart Models (in Russian)

External links 
 reifra KUNSTSTOFFTECHNIK GmbH (in German) - Successor of VEB Plasticalt

Model manufacturers of Germany
Toy brands
Volkseigene Betriebe
Manufacturing companies established in 1958
1958 establishments in East Germany